The Journal of Clinical Immunology is a bimonthly medical journal published by Springer Science+Business Media since 1981. It focuses on research investigating immunology—via basic research, translational research, or clinical studies—and diseases related to the immune system. The editor-in-chief is Vincent Bonagura (Northwell Health). According to the 2020 Journal Citation Reports, its impact factor is 8.317.

References

External links

Immunology journals
Publications established in 1981
Bimonthly journals
Springer Science+Business Media academic journals
English-language journals